Robert Sturmy was a 15th-century Bristol merchant.

In 1445 he sponsored a voyage conveying 200 pilgrims to Santiago de Compostela in Galicia and in 1447 his ship the Cog Anne took pilgrims to Jaffa in Palestine but was wrecked off Greece on the return voyage, with the loss of 37 lives. He was Sheriff of Bristol in 1450 and Mayor in 1453.

He led a commercial expedition from Bristol in 1457–58 to break the Italian monopoly on trade to the Eastern Mediterranean. If he had been successful, it would have allowed England to gain direct access to both the Oriental spices that entered Europe via the Ottoman Empire and to alum from Chios. His three-ship voyage was backed by powerful interests in England, but opposed by the Italian merchants who controlled most of Europe's long-distance trade and banking at this time. In the event, the ships succeeded in conducting their trade but were then set upon by Genoese-backed pirates on their return home. At the end of what was reported to be a three-day running battle, the Bristol fleet was captured off Malta with the loss of 128 men, including Sturmy. The financial losses, which were claimed  to amount to £6,000, were to lead to the arrest of the entire Genoese community in England and the seizure of their assets. Such an extreme reaction is less surprising when it is considered that, relative to the size of the contemporary English economy, the losses would be equivalent to c. £750 million today. The effect was thought to stymie English ambitions in the Mediterranean for at least half-a-century, although it may also have helped to persuade Bristol merchants to turn their attention to Atlantic exploration. These westwards voyages included the expeditions to try to locate the island of Hy-Brazil in the 1480s, as well as John Cabot's expeditions of 1496-98, which resulted in the European discovery of North America in 1497.

References

External links
Notes on discovery of Sturmy documents
E. T. Jones, 'Preface' to Stuart Jenks (ed.), Robert Sturmy’s Commercial Expedition To The Mediterranean (Bristol Record Society Publications, Vol. 58, 2006)
Bristol Record Society

History of Bristol
Age of Discovery
English navigators
Mayors of Bristol
High Sheriffs of Bristol